Schlieben is a town in the Elbe-Elster district, in southwestern Brandenburg, Germany. Schlieben was the site of a concentration camp during the Holocaust.

History
From 1815 to 1944, Schlieben was part of the Prussian Province of Saxony. From 1944 to 1945, it was part of the Province of Halle-Merseburg. From 1952 to 1990, it was part of the Bezirk Cottbus of East Germany.

Demography

Personalities

Sons and daughters of the city 

 Ernst Legal (1881-1955), actor, director and director

Personalities connected with the city 

  Edwin Zimmermann (* 1948), politician (SPD), 1990-1997 Minister for Food, Agriculture and Forestry of the State of Brandenburg

References

Localities in Elbe-Elster